Events from the year 1828 in the United States.

Incumbents

Federal Government 
 President: John Quincy Adams (DR/NR-Massachusetts)
 Vice President: John C. Calhoun (D-South Carolina)
 Chief Justice: John Marshall (Virginia)
 Speaker of the House of Representatives: Andrew Stevenson (D-Virginia)
 Congress: 20th

Events

 January 8 – Democratic Party is established.
 February 19 – The Boston Society for Medical Improvement is established.
 February 21 – The Cherokee Phœnix, the first newspaper published by Native Americans in the United States and in one of their indigenous languages (Cherokee), is first issued in New Echota.
 May 19 – The Tariff of 1828 is enacted. Critics name it the Tariff of Abominations because they see it as unfairly protective of northern industry to the detriment of the southern economy.
 July 4 – Construction of the Baltimore and Ohio Railroad commences with a cornerstone laid by Charles Carroll of Carrollton.
 August 11 – The Working Men's Party is founded in the City of Philadelphia, Pennsylvania as the 1st 'worker oriented' political party in the United States.
 October 27 – Gold is discovered by Benjamin Parks in or near Cherokee First Nation land in Hall County - later reorganized into Lumpkin County - in, Georgia.
 December 3 – U.S. presidential election: Challenger Andrew Jackson beats incumbent John Quincy Adams and is elected President of the United States.
 December 19 – A document written by U.S. Vice President John C. Calhoun titled South Carolina Exposition and Protest is presented to the South Carolina House of Representatives protesting the Tariff of Abominations.

Undated
 The U.S. House of Representatives election increased the majority of the Jacksonian Democrats.
 White comedian Thomas D. Rice introduces blackface and the song "Jump Jim Crow" to American audiences.
 Noah Webster's American Dictionary of the English Language is published.
 A History of the Life and Voyages of Christopher Columbus, a novel by Washington Irving, is published and popularizes the common misconception that Europeans thought the Earth was flat prior to the explorations of Columbus.
 Two minor political parties are formed: The single-issue Anti-Masonic Party in upstate New York, and the Nullifier Party advocating states' rights in opposition to the Tariff of Abominations.
 A ring spinning machine is developed in the United States.
 American Peace Society established.
John Neal publishes Rachel Dyer, the first hardcover novelized version of the Salem witch trials story

Ongoing
 20th United States Congress

Births
 January 2 – George M. Chilcott, U.S. Senator from Colorado from 1882 to 1883 (died 1891)
 January 28 – Thomas C. Hindman, U.S. Representative from Arkansas from 1859 to 1861 and Confederate general (murdered 1868)
 May 26 – Benjamin F. Rice, U.S. Senator from Arkansas from 1868 to 1873 (died 1905)
 March 24 – Horace Gray, Associate Justice of the Supreme Court of the United States (died 1902)
 April 28 – Richard Arnold, Union Army brigadier general (died 1882)
 June 2 – James Cutler Dunn Parker, organist and composer (died 1916)
 July 8 – David Turpie, U.S. Senator from Indiana in 1863 and from 1887 to 1899 (died 1909)
 July 14 – Jervis McEntee, painter of the Hudson River School (died 1891)
 August 6 – Andrew Taylor Still, "father of osteopathy" (died 1917)
 August 28 – William A. Hammond, military physician and neurologist, 11th Surgeon General of the U.S. Army from 1862 to 1864 (died 1900)
 September 8
 Joshua Chamberlain, leader of the 20th Maine during the Civil War, Governor of Maine, President of Bowdoin College (died 1914)
 Clarence Cook, art critic and writer (died 1900)
 October 19 – James F. Wilson, U.S. Senator from Iowa from 1883 to 1895 (died 1895)
 October 20 – Horatio Spafford, author of the hymn "It Is Well with My Soul" (died 1888)
 October 26 – William M. Robbins, U.S. Representative from North Carolina (died 1905)
 October 29 – Thomas F. Bayard, U.S. Senator from Delaware from 1869 to 1885 and U.S. Secretary of State from 1885 until 1889 (died 1898)
 November 17 – Milton Wright, bishop of the United Brethren Church and father of aviation pioneers the Wright brothers (died 1917)
 December 8 – Clinton B. Fisk, temperance leader (died 1890)

Deaths
 February 11 – DeWitt Clinton, 6th Governor of New York, U.S. Senator (born 1769)
 March 25 – Maria Reynolds, mistress of Alexander Hamilton (born 1768)
 June 1 – Lyncoya Jackson, 2nd adopted son of Andrew Jackson (born c. 1811)
 June 6 – John Kinzie, Fur trader responsible for "the first murder in Chicago", when he killed Jean La Lime in 1812 (born December 23, 1763)
 July 9 – Gilbert Stuart, painter (born 1755)
 September 20 – George Bethune English, adventurer, marine and diplomat (born 1797)
 December 22 – Rachel Jackson, wife of Andrew Jackson (born 1767)
Full date unknown – William Lee, personal servant and slave of George Washington (born 1750)

See also
Timeline of United States history (1820–1859)

References

External links
 

 
1820s in the United States
United States
United States
Years of the 19th century in the United States